This is a list of submissions to the 77th Academy Awards for Best Foreign Language Film. The Academy of Motion Picture Arts and Sciences has invited the film industries of various countries to submit their best film for the Academy Award for Best Foreign Language Film every year since the award was created in 1956. The award is handed out annually by the Academy to a feature-length motion picture produced outside the United States that contains primarily non-English dialogue. The Foreign Language Film Award Committee oversees the process and reviews all the submitted films.

For the 77th Academy Awards, which were held on February 27, 2005, the Academy invited 89 countries to submit films for the Academy Award for Best Foreign Language Film. Fifty-one countries submitted films to the Academy, including Malaysia, which submitted a film for the first time. The submissions from Colombia, Hong Kong and Ukraine were rejected before the formal review process, but Colombia submitted another film as a replacement. The Academy released a list of the five nominees for the award on January 25, 2005. The winner of the Academy Award for Best Foreign Language Film was Spain's The Sea Inside, which was directed by Alejandro Amenabar.

Submissions

Notes
 Colombia's original submission, Maria Full of Grace was disqualified because the Academy determined that there was too much English dialogue in the film for it to meet Academy requirements. Colombia submitted El Rey as a replacement.
 Hong Kong's submission, Running on Karma, was disqualified by the Academy, which cited problems with the film's release date.
 Ukraine's submission, A Driver for Vera, was disqualified because the Academy determined that the film was primarily Russian-produced, and thus not eligible as Ukraine's submission.

References
General

 

Specific

External links
Official website for the 77th Academy Awards

77